B. neglecta may refer to:

 Bothrops neglecta, a synonym for Bothrops pirajai, the Piraja's lancehead, a venomous pitviper species found in Brazil
 Bulbostylis neglecta, the neglected tuft sedge, a plant species endemic to Saint Helena in the South Atlantic

See also 

 Neglecta (disambiguation)